Cotriade (Kaoteriad in Breton) is a fish stew speciality from the French province of Brittany that is made with different kinds of fish, as well as potatoes, onion and garlic. Oily fish are typically used, such as herring, sprats and mackerel. Unlike bouillabaisse, another French stew, it usually does not contain shellfish. It is traditionally served by pouring it over toasted baguette. Other breads may also be used.

It is also very prominent in other French regions surrounding Brittany due to the access to the sea.

It is known in the UK as Brittany Fish Stew.

See also
 List of stews

References

French stews
Breton cuisine
Fish stews